This is a list of episodes from the television series Land of the Giants, which ran for two seasons between 1968 and 1970. The list below gives original airdates, writer, director, guest stars, and brief synopsis information of each episode.

Series overview

Episodes

Season 1 (1968–69)

Season 2 (1969–70)

Land of the Giants